Ukit is a Punan language of Sarawak, Malaysia.

'Punan Ukit' is a dialect of the related language Bukitan.

External links

Languages of Malaysia
Punan languages
Endangered Austronesian languages